The Folkerts SK-1,Speed King One, Mono Special, Matilda, Fordon-Neumann Special, Hardwick-Whittenbeck Special was a racer built for the 1930 American Cirrus Aircraft Engine Company sponsored American Cirrus Derby.

Design and development
Clayton Folkerts designed the "Mono Special" while working for the Mono-Aircraft Corporation. It was later renamed the SK-1. The aircraft was a strut-braced mid-winged conventional geared aircraft with a slender tapered tail and undersized wheels and fairings.

Operational history
In 1930, for the American Cirrus Derby, pilot John Livingston was hired, but Stub Quimby flew in his place after an illness. The team did not win any earnings. In the 1930 National Air Races, Quimby placed fourth in the 650 Cubic inch class at 142 mph.

In the 1933 American Air Races, the aircraft was renamed the Folkerts SK-1, with modified lift struts and addition of wheel pants. The aircraft won first place twice in the 350 cubic inch class, and third in the 500 cubic inch class piloted by Harold Neumann, and fifth piloted by Marcellus King. During the 1933 International Air Races, Roy Ligget and Roy Hosler won two fifths and one fourth at a speed of 170 mph.

In the 1934 Pan American Air Races, the aircraft was renamed "Matilda". In the 1935 National Air Races, with a modified headrest fairing, the aircraft raced as the "Fordon-Neumann Special" and placed second at 187 mph .

In the 1937 National Air Races, the aircraft raced as the "Hardwick-Whittenbeck Special"

Specifications (Folkerts SK-1)

See also

References

Notes

Bibliography

 Foxworth, Thomas G. The Speed Seekers. New York: New York: Doubleday, 1976. .
 Matowitz, Thomas G. Jr. Cleveland's National Air Races (Images of Aviation). Mount Pleasant, South Carolina: Arcadia Publishing, 2006. .
 Schmid, Sylvester H. and Truman C. Weaver. The Golden Age of Air Racing: 1927-1933. Oshkosh, Wisconsin: EAA Aviation Foundation, 1983. .

Racing aircraft
Mid-wing aircraft
Single-engined tractor aircraft
Aircraft first flown in 1930